Agelanthus microphyllus is a species of hemiparasitic plant in the family Loranthaceae, which is native to Ethiopia, Kenya and Tanzania.

Description 
A description of the plant is given in Govaerts et al., based on  Polhill & Wiens  (1999).

Habitat/ecology
A. microphyllus grows on Acacia species in deciduous bushland, and is an extremely scattered and uncommon species.

Threats 
The main threat is habitat conversion to agriculture, in particular, to maize plantations.

References

Flora of Tanzania
Flora of Kenya
Flora of Ethiopia
microphyllus